This list is of the Cultural Properties of Japan designated in the category of  for the Prefecture of Okinawa.

National Cultural Properties
As of 1 August 2020, six Important Cultural Properties have been designated (including one *National Treasure), being of national significance.

Prefectural Cultural Properties
As of 1 May 2019, six properties have been designated at a prefectural level.

Municipal Cultural Properties
As of 1 May 2019, forty-three properties have been designated at a municipal level.

See also
 Cultural Properties of Japan
 List of National Treasures of Japan (historical materials)
 List of Historic Sites of Japan (Okinawa)
 List of Cultural Properties of Japan - archaeological materials (Okinawa)
 Writing in the Ryukyu Kingdom

References

External links
  National Treasure: Ryukyu King Sho Family Related Documents
  Database of Photographs by Kamakura Yoshitarō for his Investigation into Ryūkyū Art
  Cultural Properties in Okinawa Prefecture
  List of Cultural Properties in Okinawa Prefecture

Cultural Properties,historical materials
Cultural Properties,historical materials
Cultural Properties,historical materials
Historical materials,Oklinawa